Equulites is a genus of ponyfishes native to the Indian Ocean and the western Pacific Ocean. Analysis of mitochondrial DNA published in 2017 has suggested that Equulites elongates is in fact a species group made up of three species  Equulites aethopos, Equulites elongates and Equulites popei.

Species
There are currently 10 recognized species in this genus: 
 Equulites absconditus Chakrabarty & Sparks, 2010
 Equulites aethopos Suzuki & Kimura, 2017 (Red Sea elongated ponyfish)
 Equulites elongatus (Günther, 1874) (Slender ponyfish)
 Equulites klunzingeri (Steindachner, 1898)
 Equulites laterofenestra (Sparks & Chakrabarty, 2007)
 Equulites leuciscus (Günther, 1860) (Whipfin ponyfish)
 Equulites lineolatus (Valenciennes, 1835) (Ornate ponyfish)
 Equulites oblongus (Valenciennes, 1835) (Oblong ponyfish)
 Equulites popei (Whitley, 1932) (Pope's ponyfish)
 Equulites rivulatus (Temminck & Schlegel, 1845)

References

 
Taxa named by Henry Weed Fowler
Fish described in 1904